Abdi Toptani (28 August 1864 – 1 August 1942) was a 19th-century Albanian politician. He was one of the signatories of the Albanian Declaration of Independence along with his relative Murat. He served as Minister of Finances in the Provisional Government of Albania, and in Prince Wied's cabinet. In the Congress of Lushnjë he became one of the regents of Albania.

References

1864 births
1942 deaths
Date of death missing
Place of death missing
19th-century Albanian politicians
20th-century Albanian politicians
Signatories of the Albanian Declaration of Independence
Abdi
Politicians from Tirana
All-Albanian Congress delegates
Congress of Durrës delegates
Government ministers of Albania
Finance ministers of Albania